Antonio Valero Ruiz (born 18 June 1971) is a Spanish former footballer who played as a midfielder.

Career
Born in Dehesas de Guadix, Valero played club football for San Fernando, CP Almería, Polideportivo Ejido, Motril and Granada 74.

References

1971 births
Living people
Spanish footballers
CD San Fernando players
CP Almería players
Polideportivo Ejido footballers
Motril CF players
Granada 74 CF footballers
Segunda División B players
Segunda División players
Association football midfielders